Parategeticula is a genus of moths of the family Prodoxidae, one of three genera known as yucca moths; they are mutualistic pollinators of various Yucca species.

Species
 Parategeticula ecdysiastica
 Parategeticula elephantipella
 Parategeticula martella
 Parategeticula pollenifera
 Parategeticula tzoyatlella

References
Parategeticula at tolweb

Prodoxidae
Adeloidea genera